Parioxys is an extinct genus of temnospondyl amphibian from the Early Permian of Texas.

History of study 
The type species, Parioxys ferricolus, was named in 1878 by American paleontologist Edward Drinker Cope based on two badly preserved skulls that were collected from the early Permian Texas red-beds. Egyptian paleontologist Youssef S. Moustafa, described new material of P. ferricolus from other localities in Texas. This taxon was recently redescribed by Schoch & Sues (2022). Moustafa also described another species, P. romeri, on the basis of an isolated humerus, but this was regarded as being indeterminate. A second definitive species, P. bolli, was described by Canadian paleontologist Robert Carroll in 1964. This taxon is only known from postcranial material.

Relationships 
Parioxys was historically considered to be closely related to eryopoids, more specifically the well-known Eryops megalocephalus, which was collected from the same locality as the type material of P. ferricolus. Cope himself listed P. ferricolus as a species of Eryops, possibly because he considered it to be a juvenile specimen of Eryops. It was shortly revived as a distinct genus with a suggestion that the original specimen's described by Cope might have been inadvertently described as other taxa by other authors, but its affinities continued to be debated, with some suggestions that it might instead belong to the Trematopidae. Moustafa (1955a) placed Parioxys in its own family and suggested that it was related to the Dissorophidae. Schoch & Milner (2014) placed Parioxys within Dissorophidae based on personal observations of further preparation of historic material, although this has not been tested in a phylogenetic analysis due to the poor quality of much of the material.

The most recent revision by Schoch & Sues (2022) tested the position of P. ferricolus in a dissorophoid matrix and recovered it as a eucacopine dissorophid of closest relationship to the middle Permian Kamacops. They list the following features as features shared between this species and Kamacops and not with Cacops: (1) smaller interpterygoid vacuities, resulting from the medial expansion of palatine and pterygoid (condition more extreme in K. acervalis); (2) the enlarged vomer with the posteriorly elongated, slit-like choana; and (3) the absence of an internarial fenestra.

References

Cisuralian temnospondyls of North America
Prehistoric amphibian genera